Nigel Cabourn (born 1949) is a British fashion designer known for his outerwear and vintage inspired clothing. He studied fashion design at Northumbria University between 1967 and 1971 and his studio and business is still based in the North East of England.

He began his eponymous label in the 1970s, and is known for his menswear collections that are influenced by military clothing and vintage clothing, using fabrics such as Harris Tweed and Ventile.

In 2013 he launched his first womenswear collection.

The Army Gym is the Japanese shop for the Nigel Cabourn brands. In August 2008, Nigel Cabourn Marketing Ltd., was set up as a joint venture with Abahouse Holdings Co. Ltd., the joint owner of Outer Limits Co. Ltd., that makes the Nigel Cabourn ‘Mainline’ collection.

In September 2014 he opened his first standalone UK flagship store at 28 Henrietta Street, Covent Garden, London. There are 26 Nigel Cabourn stores across the globe, 16 in Japan 7 in China and 1 in Hong Kong, China.

See also
 Street fashion
 Ura-Harajuku
 Hiroshi Fujiwara
 Jun Takahashi

References

External links
 

English businesspeople in fashion
English fashion designers
High fashion brands
Living people
1949 births